The revolution of 1951 in Nepal, also referred to as Sat Salko Kranti, was a political movement against the direct rule by the Rana dynasty of Nepal which had lasted for 104 years. It marks the beginning of the political awakening and democratic movements in Nepal, and resulted in immediate abolition of the institutionalized hereditary Prime Minister system in Nepal.

Background of Rana regime 
The rise of the Ranas was heightened by plotting the Kot Massacre by Jang Bahadur Rana and his brothers gained power, thus reduced the power of monarch to a figurehead, and the position of Prime Minister was made powerful and hereditary. The Rana regime pursued a policy of isolating Nepal from external influences. The Ranas further established their power by turning pro-British, and assisted the British during the Sepoy Rebellion in 1857.

Organization for revolution
Popular dissatisfaction against of the Ranas started emerging from among educated people and from within the Ranas, many of whom were marginalised within the Rana hierarchy. Many of these Nepalese were in exile and had actively taken part in the Indian Independence struggle and wanted to liberate Nepal as well. The political parties like the Praja Parishad and the Nepali Rastriya Congress were formed in exile by people who wanted to stage both military and popular political revolutions in Nepal.

Uprisings and incidents

Nepal Praja Parishad
The founding of the Nepal Praja Parishad was proposed by Dashrath Chand and Tanka Prasad Acharya in a hotel in Bhimphedi, Makwanpur District of Nepal. It was founded in 1936 when they received the support of additional people including Dharma Bhakta Mathema among others. The organization's head office was kept in Dharma Bhakta Mathema's house in OmBahal. Initially, Nepal Praja Parishad distributed hand-written pamphlets among the people and wrote articles against the Rana Dynasty in Nepal in an Indian socialist paper Janata and another paper published in Calcutta named Advance. Later Tanka Prasad Acharya brought a printing machine from India, and the organization started to distribute pamphlets against the Rana dynasty to enlighten the people against the rule of the Ranas in Nepal. On January 19, 1941, the court of the Ranas gave the death penalty to Shukraraj Shastri (who was not involved in Praja Parishad), Dharma Bhakta Mathema, Ganga Lal Shrestha, and Dashrath Chand, who are now recognized as the martyrs of Nepal. Many others were sentenced to jail and many were exiled. Thus Nepal Praja Parishad was dissolved in January 1941.

National congress
On January 26, 1947, the Nepali National Congress was formed in India under the leadership of Bishweshwar Prasad Koirala. Since establishment Congress organized underground activities but on March 4, 1947 (Falgun, 2003 B.S.) Workers of Biratnagar Jute mill demonstrated and started striking against the management. under the leadership of Girija Prasad Koirala and Bishweshwar Prasad Koirala. Nepali National Congress participated in this Biratnagar jute mill strike, supporting the strikers and demanded a Political labour union. To suppress the strike the Rana regime sent the state troops over the long and difficult mountain trail to Biratnagar. The strike continued until the troops reached Biratnagar and arrested the leaders. Nepali National congress held a delegates' conference at Jogbani, India and resolved to initiate a nationwide 'satyagraha' (civil disobedience movement on the Indian model) and thus countrywide anti-Rana demonstration started.

Jayatu Sanskritam
In June 1947, students enrolled in the Tin Dhara school launched the Jayatu Sanskritam movement, demanding democracy and inclusion of modern subjects in the curriculum. It was the first student uprising in Nepal's history, and was led by Parashuram Pokhrel, Purna Prasad Brahman, Sribhadra Sharma Khanal, Ram Prasad Neupane, Kamal Raj Regmi, Rajeshwor Devkota and Gokarna Shastri. Forty-two of the participants were exiled by the Rana rulers, and others were imprisoned. Exiles in India later joined the agitation launched for the establishment of democracy under by B.P. Koirala and other leaders.

King Tribhuvan's exile 

King Tribhuvan's anti Rana attitude had been an open secret for a long time in Nepal. King Tribhuvan himself gave explicit support to Nepal Praja Parishad, to try to overthrow the Ranas. In each instance, however, the Ranas responded harshly, banning the liberal movements and executing their leadership. Even then King Tribhuvan worked closely with Praja Parishad in trying to end the Rana regime. Finally, in November 1950, King Tribhuvan took refuge at the Indian Embassy against the Ranas. He was accompanied by his son Mahendra and the eldest grandson Birendra, among others. Prime Minister Mohan Shamsher Jang Bahadur Rana became furious and responded to Tribhuvan's move by calling an emergency meeting of the cabinet on 7 November 1950 at Singha Durbar. In that meeting he announced Gyanendra Bir Bikram Shah, the three-year-old grandson of King Tribhuvan, would be the new King of Nepal. In the afternoon, on the same day, Prince Gyandendra Bir Bikram Shah was brought to Hanuman Dhoka Palace and crowned as the king of Nepal. On 10 November, two Indian planes landed at Gauchar Airport and flew back to New Delhi with the Royal family excluding the infant King, Gyanendra. King Tribhuvan was formally welcomed by the Indian prime minister Jawahar Lal Nehru and other high officials. Appointment of the new king led to huge demonstrations throughout the country. On November 22, 1950, Jawahar Lal Nehru, the Prime Minister of India, officially announced that India was not going to recognize Gyanendra Bir Bikram Shah as the legitimate King of Nepal.

Nepali Congress's Liberation Army
After King Tribhuvan fled to the Indian embassy, the Nepali Congress Party launched a military wing called Congress Mukti Sena, also known as Nepali Congress's Liberation Army, and started an armed uprising against the Rana rule . The Congress Mukti Sena controlled significant places in the plains of Terai, but held little power in the political capital, Kathmandu.

Delhi Accord
After a mutual agreement between Ranas, Nepali Congress and King Tribhuvan, a tripartite agreement was signed in Delhi. Finally, On February 18, 1951 (7th Falgun 2007 B.S.), King Tribhuvan returned to Nepal as head of state. The major provisions of the Delhi Accord (Agreement) are as follows:

 An elected constituent assembly will create a democratic constitution within 2 years.
 There will remain an interim cabinet (government) of 10 ministers under the Prime Ministership of Mohan Shumsher, of which 5 ministerial positions will be taken by the Nepali Congress.
 There will be no restriction to political organizations. All the political prisoners will be set free and agitators have to hand over all their weapons to the government.
 King Tribhuvan will remain the King of Nepal and ultimate power lies in the monarch.

Formation of the Coalition Government

On 15 February 1951, King Tribhuvan and the leading members of the Nepali Congress returned to Kathmandu. A huge flock of supporters gathered and welcome the monarch at the airport. On 18 February 1951, King Tribhuvan announced Nepal's first steps to democracy with a historical proclamation and a cabinet headed by Sir Mohan Shumsher Jang Bahadur Rana, and split among the Ranas and the Nepali Congress Party. The followings were the members of the Cabinet.

From the Ranas:

 1. Mohan Shumsher Jung Bahadur Rana - Prime Minister and Foreign Affairs
 2. Baber Shumsher Jung Bahadur Rana- (younger brother of Mohan Shamsher; was in line for the next premiership) - Defence
 3. Chudraj Shamsher - ("B" class Rana representative) - Forests
 4. Nripa Janga Rana - ("C" class Rana representative) - Education
 5. Yagya Bahadur Basnyat - (Rana Bhardar) - Health and Local self-government

From the Nepali Congress side:

 1. B.P. Koirala - Home
 2. Subarna Shamsher Rana- (even though a Rana, he was a key member of the Nepali Congress) - Finance
 3. Ganesh Man Singh - Commerce and Industry
 4. Bharatmani Sharma - Food and Agriculture
 5. Bhadrakali Mishra  - Transport

This cabinet was reshuffled on 10 June 1951 to replace Baber Shamsher by Shangha Shamsher and Bharatmani Sharma by Surya Prasad Upadhyaya

Aftermath
The coalition was a mixture of conservative Ranas, who were trying to hold on to as much political power as possible, and radical reformers, who had almost no administrative experience. It was able to enact a new constitution entitled the Interim Government of Nepal Act 1951, drafted with the help of Indian experts and was in many ways inspired by the Constitution of India. This interim government was able to set up a separate judicial branch and importantly transfer all executive powers back to the king, including supreme command of the armed forces and power to appoint government officials and manage finances. Later, the entire bloc of Nepali Congress Party ministers resigned in November, which allowed the king to appoint a new government for the first time since the nineteenth century. The king used the opportunity to exclude for good the conservative Rana power bloc. A royal proclamation on November 16, 1951, established a new government led by Matrika Prasad (M.P.) Koirala, the half-brother of B.P. Koirala, who had run the Nepali Congress Party during the revolutionary struggle.

See also
 Nepali Congress
 Biratnagar jute mill strike
 Ram Prasad Rai
 List of Nepali democratic movement (1951) activists

References

History of Nepal (1951–2008)
Rana regime
1951 in Nepal
Conflicts in 1951